Biomphalaria is a genus of air-breathing freshwater snails, aquatic pulmonate gastropod mollusks in the family Planorbidae, the ram's horn snails and their allies.

Biomphalaria is the type genus of the tribe Biomphalariini.

Taphius is a synonym for Biomphalaria.

The shell of this species, like all planorbids is sinistral in coiling, but is carried upside down and thus appears to be dextral.

Species 
As of 2008 there were recognized 34 extant species in the genus Biomphalaria in total (22 American species and 12 Old World species). There were also described number of fossil Biomphalaria species.

American species include:

 Biomphalaria amazonica Paraense, 1966
 Biomphalaria andecola (d'Orbigny, 1835)
 Biomphalaria cousini
 Biomphalaria edisoni Estrada, Velásquez, Caldeira, Bejarano, Rojas & Carvalho, 2006
 Biomphalaria glabrata (Say, 1818)
 Biomphalaria havanensis (L. Pfeiffer, 1839)
 Biomphalaria helophila (d'Orbigny, 1835)
 Biomphalaria intermedia (Paraense & Deslandes, 1962)
 Biomphalaria kuhniana (Clessin, 1883)
 † Biomphalaria manya Cabrera & Martinez, 2018
 Biomphalaria obstructa
 Biomphalaria occidentalis Paraense, 1981
 Biomphalaria oligoza Paraense, 1974
 Biomphalaria orbignyi Paraense, 1975
 Biomphalaria peregrina (d'Orbigny, 1835)
 Biomphalaria prona
 Biomphalaria schrammi (Crosse, 1864)
 Biomphalaria straminea (Dunker, 1848)
 Biomphalaria subprona (Martens, 1899)
 Biomphalaria temascalensis Rangel-Ruiz, 1987
 Biomphalaria tenagophila (d'Orbigny, 1835)

Old World (Africa, Madagascar and the Middle East) species include:
 Biomphalaria alexandrina
 Biomphalaria angulosa Mandahl-Barth, 1957
 Biomphalaria barthi Brown, 1973
 Biomphalaria camerunensis
 Biomphalaria choanomphala
 Biomphalaria pfeifferi (Krauss, 1848)
 Biomphalaria salinarum Morelet
 Biomphalaria smithi Preston, 1910 - type species
 Biomphalaria stanleyi (Smith, 1888)
 Biomphalaria sudanica (Martens, 1870)
 Biomphalaria tchadiensis Germain, 1904
 Biomphalaria ruppellii Auet. - subspecies: Biomphalaria ruppellii ruppellii Auet.; Biomphalaria ruppellii katangae Haas

There is one known hybrid Biomphalaria glabrata × Biomphalaria alexandrina from Egypt.

A cladogram showing phylogenic relations of (23 analyzed) species in the genus Biomphalaria:

Distribution 
The origin of the genus Biomphalaria is American. The ancestor of Biomphalaria glabrata colonized Africa 2.3–4.5 or 2-5 millions years ago and speciated into all the African Biomphalaria species.

Natural populations of these snails are usually found in tropical standing water or freshwater in South America and Africa, but they also reach 30° latitude in subtropical areas. Many species of these red-blooded planorbid snails (Gastropoda: Basommatophora) are able to survive a long time when removed from their freshwater habitat. Of the 34 Biomphalaria species, 4 (Biomphalaria glabrata, Biomphalaria pfeifferi, Biomphalaria straminea, and Biomphalaria tenagophila) have recently expanded their native ranges. They have been introduced to areas where other Biomphalaria species are endemic (e.g., Congo and Egypt) or to subtropical zones that have no frost period (Texas, Louisiana, Florida, Hong Kong).

All species in the genus Biomphalaria except of native Biomphalaria obstructa has not yet become established in the US, but they are considered to represent a potentially serious threat as a pest, an invasive species which could negatively affect agriculture, natural ecosystems, human health or commerce. Therefore, it has been suggested that this species be given top national quarantine significance in the USA.

Parasites 
This genus of snails is medically important, because the snails can carry a parasite of humans which represents a serious disease risk: the snails serve as an intermediate host (vector) for the human parasitic blood fluke, Schistosoma mansoni, that infects about 83 million people.

The human disease schistosomiasis (aka snail fever) caused by all Schistosoma species (transmitted also by other snails) infects 200 million people. The fluke, which is found primarily in tropical areas, infects mammals (including humans) via contact with water that contains schistosome larvae (cercariae) which have previously been released from the snail. Infection occurs via penetration of cercariae through the skin.

Eighteen species of Biomphalaria are intermediate hosts for Schistosoma mansoni; seven species of the genus have not been tested for this susceptibility and nine species are resistant.

Altogether about 30 species of parasites from Africa and at least 20 species from the Neotropics are known to parasitize Biomphalaria.

References
This article incorporates public domain text from the Majoros et al. reference.

Further reading 
 Baker F. C. (1945) The molluscan family Planorbidae. Urbana, The University of Illinois Press, page 89
  Brasil. Ministério da Saúde. Secretaria de Vigilância em Saúde. Departamento de Vigilância Epidemiológica. (2007) Vigilância e controle de moluscos de importância epidemiológica : diretrizes técnicas : Programa de Vigilância e Controle da Esquistossomose (PCE). Ministério da Saúde, Secretaria de Vigilância em Saúde, Departamento de Vigilância Epidemiológica. 2. ed. Brasília : Editora do Ministério da Saúde. 178 pp. . (Surveillance and Control of Mollusks with Epidemiological Importance: technical directives: Schistosomiasis Control and Surveillance Program)
 Chapter: Aquaculture and schistosomiasis. In: Larsson B. (December 1994) Three overviews on environment and aquaculture in the tropics and sub-tropics. ALCOM (Aquaculture for Local Community Development Programme) Field Document No. 27, 52 pp.
 .

 
Gastropod genera